The men's 5000 metres race of the 2013–14 ISU Speed Skating World Cup 4, arranged in Sportforum Hohenschönhausen, in Berlin, Germany, was held on 8 December 2013.

Jorrit Bergsma of the Netherlands won the race, while fellow Dutchman Jan Blokhuijsen came second, and Lee Seung-hoon of South Korea came third. Dmitry Babenko of Kazakhstan won the Division B race.

Results
The race took place on Sunday, 8 December 2013, with Division B scheduled in the morning session, at 11:07, and Division A scheduled in the afternoon session, at 15:14.

Division A

Division B

References

Men 5000
4